Equinox is a Danish supernatural thriller Netflix series created by Tea Lindeburg, based on the Danish podcast Equinox 1985. The series premiered on 30 December 2020 and stars Danica Curcic in the lead role of Astrid, a young woman who investigates the disappearance of her sister twenty years before.

Synopsis
In 1999, nine-year-old Astrid is traumatized by the mysterious disappearance of her sister Ida together with her school class, who are celebrating their graduation in a typically Danish fashion. Astrid suffers from nightmares and horrific visions following the tragedy. Twenty-one years later, when one of the survivors from the class calls her up unexpectedly, Astrid decides to investigate what happened in 1999. As she begins her exploration of the long-ago events, she discovers a dark and unsettling truth that involves her in ways she never imagined.

Cast and characters
 Danica Curcic as Astrid
 Lars Brygmann as Dennis
 Karoline Hamm as Ida
 Hanne Hedelund as Lene
 Viola Martinsen as Astrid, 9 years old
 Fanny Bornedal as Amelia
 August Carter as Jakob
 Ask Truelsen as Falke
 Alexandre Willaume as Henrik
 Peder Holm Johansen as Torben
 Rasmus Hammerich as Mathias
 Zaki Nobel Mehabil as David
 Tina Gylling Mortensen as Doris
 Susanne Storm as Isobel

Episodes

See also
 Cernunnos
 Ostara

References

External links
 
 
 
 Equinox 1985 on player.fm

2020 Danish television series debuts
Danish-language Netflix original programming
Television shows set in Denmark
Danish fantasy television series